Helicops may refer to:

Helicops (snake)
Helicops (video game)